Spreckels is a surname. Notable people with the surname include:

Claus Spreckels, founder of the Spreckels Sugar Company, at one time considered the King of Sugar
John D. Spreckels, son of Claus Spreckels and entrepreneur
Adolph B. Spreckels, son of Claus Spreckels and an entrepreneur and philanthropist
Alma de Bretteville Spreckels, socialite, philanthropist, and wife of Adolph B. Spreckels
Judy Spreckels, writer, publisher, trial historian and former friend of Elvis Presley